Outside TV (formerly RSN Television) is a sports-oriented cable and satellite television network based on Outside magazine. The network features programming related to various outdoor activities and the lives of those who engage in them. High-definition programs appear on the company's cable, satellite and broadband providers’ sports and entertainment offerings.

History
Outside TV was the result of a complete re-branding of the existing Resort Sports Network, the national television network that specialized in creating and distributing outdoor-lifestyle content to premier vacation destinations throughout the country.

As of June 2010, Outside TV was in 110 resort markets representing 61 million potential viewers.

Outside TV has a corporate office in Westport, Connecticut, and a main office in Portland, Maine.  Its sales office is in the Graybar Building at 420 Lexington in New York City.

Outside TV was founded by publisher Lawrence Burke and founding executive producer and executive vice president Les Guthman in 1994.  Over the next ten years, it produced the Outside Television Presents TV series, whose production Farther Than the Eye Can See, captured blind climber Erick Weihenmayer's historic ascension to the summit of Mount Everest.  Into the Tsangpo Gorge, produced by director and expedition leader Scott Lindgren, achieved the first whitewater descent of through the 18,000-ft.-deep Tsangpo Gorge (Yarlung Tsangpo Grand Canyon) in Tibet.  Into the Tsangpo Gorge aired on NBC Sports in May 2002 and was Outside Magazine'''s cover story in July 2002.

In July 2013, Outside TV entered into a new multi-year distribution agreement with the National Cable Television Cooperative (NCTC), representing more than 950 different cable providers and thousands of local systems nationwide. The addition of NCTC to Outside Television's other core distribution partners such as Comcast Xfinity makes the independent network available to more than 40 million homes.

Outsidetv.com is a digital portal that caters to their online community – from athletes and adventurists to filmmakers.  The community allows members to interact directly with one another while sharing content across the entire group.

The newly designed portal showcases thousands of adventure videos with a mosaic interface. The site's goal is to curate visual adventure experiences and provide a convenient forum to experience them.

 OTV Features and Streaming 

 Subscription Video On Demand (SVOD) 
On December 22, 2016, Outside TV launched Outside TV Features, a subscription video on-demand service showcasing a wide-ranging collection of full-length adventure sports films.  The app was made available on Amazon Channels for a $4.99 monthly subscription fee.  Featured athletes and adventurers include surf champion Kelly Slater, skateboarder Paul Rodriguez, motorsports competitor Travis Pastrana, surfer and Standup Paddleboarding icon Kai Lenny, 2016 World Surf League (WSL) champion John John Florence, wingsuit pilot and professional BASE jumper Jeb Corliss, among others.  Outside TV Features was made available on Amazon Channels, Amazon Fire TV, iOS, Apple TV, Android and ROKU.

 Free App (Outside TV Shorts) 
In addition to its subscription based offering, Outside TV also possesses a free app called Outside TV Shorts.  The free version of the Outside TV Features app limits the amount of content a viewer can see.  Most video "shorts" are typically 2–6 minutes in length and are categorized by sport.  The shorts cover Outside TV's films, TV shows, and live events.  There is also a subscription option for Outside TV Features, where viewers are able to start a 7-day trial of Outside TV Features before paying a subscription fee.

 Awards 
In addition to airing on television, Outside TV's documentaries produced between 1995 and 2004 appeared in 177 international film festivals and won 29 film festival awards.  Farther Than the Eye Can See was shot by director and cameraman Michael Brown and earned two Emmy Nominations in 2004 for Best Sports Documentary and Best Sports Cinematography.  Scott Lindgren's Into the Tsangpo Gorge'' was recognized by the Explorers Club as one of the most accomplished expeditions of modern times.

Programming

See also

Similar networks
 Outdoor Channel
 Sportsman Channel 
 NBC Sports Outdoors (segment on NBCSN)
 MyOutdoorTV.com

References

External links
Official site

Companies based in Westport, Connecticut
Television channels and stations established in 1994
Sports television networks in the United States